Marajó Archipelago is the largest fluvial-maritime archipelago on Earth. Located in the states of Amapá and Pará, in Brazil, it is formed by about 2,500 islands.

The main island of the archipelago also has the name of Marajó, having about 42,000 km² of area, considered, due to its size, as the largest coastal island in Brazil, extending from the mouth of the Amazon River, between the Line of the Equator and the parallel 1.55º south latitude and, in the E/W direction between the meridians 47º and 53º west longitude, until the Atlantic Ocean.

The aquatic and forming limits of the archipelago are: the Atlantic Ocean (north); the Marajó Bay (east); the Pará River estuary complex (south), and; the Amazon delta (west).

Most important islands 

The largest and most important islands include:

Marajó Island: the largest and most populated of the islands;
Grande de Gurupá Island;
Island of Franco;
Island of Brique;
Island of Flautino;
Island of Curuá;
Caviana Meridional Island;
Caviana Setentrional Island;
Mexiana Island;
Januaçu Island;
Jurupari Island;
Santana Island;
Siriri Island;
Rasa Island;
Pracuubinhas Island;
Maruim Island;
Prapion Island;
Cará Island;
Queimada Island;
Pará Island;
Morcego Island;
Panema Island;
Conceição Norte Island;
Porcos Island;
Vieira Island;
São Salvador Island;
Maracujá Island;
Salvador Island;
Island of Mucuti;
Island of the Guaribas;
Island of Corre;
Roberta Island;
Buquiá Island;
Urutaí Island;
Aranaí Island;
Mutunguara Island;
Camarão Island;
Miritiapina Island;
Grande de Santa Maria Island;
Aturiá Island;
Samanajós Island;
Carutá Island;
Pracatí Island;
Island of Melgaço;
Island of Bagre;
Island of Araras;
Mujirum Island;
Island of Taquari;
Conceição Sul Island;
Camaleão Island;
Machadinho Island;
Joroca Island;
Saracura Island;
Jupatituba Island;
São Francisco da Jararaca Island;
Grande do Pacajaí Island.

See also 
 Marajó Archipelago Environmental Protection Area.

References 

Archipelagoes of Brazil